Peter is a common masculine given name. It is derived directly from Greek , Petros (an invented, masculine form of Greek petra, the word for "rock" or "stone"), which itself was a translation of Aramaic Kefa ("stone, rock"), the new name Jesus gave to apostle Simon Bar-Jona. An Old English variant is Piers.

In other languages The following names can be interpreted as Peter in English.
 Afrikaans: Pieter, Petrus
 Albanian: Pjetër, Prel
 Amharic: ጴጥሮስ ("Ṗeṭros")
 Arabic: بطرس (Boutros), بيار ("Pierre," mainly in Lebanon), بيتر ("Peter," exact transcription)
 Aragonese: Pietro, Pero, Piero, Pier
 Azerbaijani: Pyotr
 Armenian: Պետրոս (Bedros in Western dialect, Petros in Eastern dialect)
 Asturian: Pedru
 Basque: Peru, Pello (diminutive), Pedro, Piarres, Petri (Biblical), Kepa (neologism)
 Belarusian: Пётр (Piotr), Пятро (Piatro), Пятрусь (Piatrus)
 Bengali: পাথর (Pathor)
 Breton: Pêr
 Bulgarian: Петър (Petər), Пере, Перо (Pere, Pero), Петьо, Петю (Petyo, Petyu), Пеньо, Пеню, Пенко (Penyo, Penyu, Penko), Пельо, Пелю, Пелко (Pelyo, Pelyu, Pelko), Пешо (Pesho); Камен (Kamen) ("kamen, kamək" in Bulgarian means: stone)
 Catalan: Pere
 Cebuano: Pedro
 Standard Chinese:
 Protestant: 彼得 (Bǐdé)
 Catholic: 伯多祿 (Bóduōlù)
 Coptic: ⲡⲉⲧⲣⲟⲥ (Ṗeṭros)
 Cornish: Peder
 Croatian: Petar, Pero, Periša, Pera, Pejo
 Czech: Petr, Péťa (diminutive)
 Danish: Peter, Peder, Per, Peer, Pelle
 Dutch: Pieter, Peter, Piet, Pier (Note: The form "Peer" also occurs, albeit less commonly. The Biblical Peter is translated as "Petrus.")
 Emiliano-Romagnolo: Pèdar
 Esperanto: Petro
 Estonian: Peeter, Peep, Peetrus, Pavo, Peedo
 Faroese: Pætur, Petur, Per
 Filipino: Pedro, Pedring (diminutive)
 Frisian: Piter, Pier
 Finnish: Pietari, Pekka, Petri, Petteri
 French: Pierre (Note: the word for stone in French is also "pierre")
 Galician: Pedro
 Georgian: პეტრე (Petre)
 German: Peter (Note: The form "Peer" also occurs, albeit less commonly. The Biblical Peter is translated as "Petrus.")
 Greek: Πέτρος (Petros)
 Guarani Peru
 Gujarati: પીટર (Pīṭar)
 Gungbe: Pita 
 Haitian Creole: Pyè. The name is spelled "Pierre" and pronounced "pyè"; also meaning "stone."
 Hausa: Bitrus 
 Hindi: Pathrus, पीटर (Pīṭar)
 Hebrew: פטרוס (Petros), פטר (literally Peter)
 Hungarian: Péter; Petya, Peti (diminutive)
 Icelandic: Pétur, Pési (diminutive)
 Indonesian: Petrus
 Irish: Piaras, Peadar
 Italian: Pietro, Pier, Piero (Note: the word for stone in Italian is "pietra")
 Japanese:
 Protestant: ピーター (Pītā)
 Catholic: ペトロ (Petoro), ペテロ (Petero),
 Biblical contexts: ペトロス (Petorosu)
 Khmer: Pathra
 Konkani: Pedru
 Korean: 베드로 (Bedro; or, less commonly, 페트루스; Petrus), 피터 (Pitə)
 Lao: ເປໂຕ (Peot)
 Latin: Petrus
 Latvian: Pēteris
 Lingala: Petelo
 Lithuanian: Petras
 Lombard: Peder
 Low German: Petrus
 Luganda: Petero
 Luxembourgish: Pit, Pier
 Macedonian: Петар (Petar), Питер (Piter), Петре (Petre), Перо (Pero), Пере (Pere), Перица (Perica)
 Malayalam: പത്രോസ് (Patrōs), പീരി("Peeri," from Pierre)
 Maltese: Pietru
 Manx: Peddyr
 Māori: Petera, Pita
 Marathi: पेत्र (petrə), पेद्रो (pedro)
 Mongolian: Петр (Pyetr)
 Montenegrin: Petar (Петар), Pero (Перо)
 Nepali: पत्रुस (Patrus)
 Norman: Pierre
 Northern Sami: Pekka, Piera, Biera, Bierril, Bierža, Biehtár
 Norwegian: Peter, Petter, Per, Pelle, Peder
 Nahuatl: Pedro
 Occitan: Pèire, Pèir, Pèr
 Persian: Pedros, Pedrush
 Polish: Piotr. Diminutives/hypocoristics include Piotrek, Piotruś, and Piotrunio. Piotr has several name days in Poland.
 Portuguese: Pedro, Pêro (old Portuguese) (Note: the word for stone in Portuguese is "pedra")
 Punjabi: ਪਤਰਸਨੂੰ (Patarasanū)
 Quechua: Pidru, Rumi
 Romanian: Petru, Petre, Petrică (diminutive), Petrișor (diminutive)
 Russian: Пётр (Pyotr), Петя (Petya) (diminutive), Петруха (Petrukha) (colloquial)
 Samoan: Petelo
 Sardinian: Pedru, Perdu, Pretu
 Scottish Gaelic: Peadair
 Serbian: Петар (Petar), Перо (Pero), Пера (Pera), Перица (Perica), Периша (Periša)
 Serbo-Croatian: Petar (Петар), Pero (Перо), Pera (Пера), Perica (Перица), Periša (Периша), 
 Sicilian: Pietru
 Silesian: Pyjter, Piter
 Sinhala: Peduru
 Slovak: Peter, Peťo
 Slovene: 
 Spanish: Pedro
 Swahili: Petero
 Swedish: Peter, Petter, Peder, Per, Pehr, Pär, Pelle, Pälle (Note: The Biblical Peter is translated as "Petrus.")
 Syriac: ܦܛܪܘܣ (Peṭrus)
Tagalog: Pedro
 Tamil: Pethuru, Raayappar (in biblical contexts)
 Telugu: పేతురు Peturu
 , เปโตร (Petro, in biblical contexts)
 Tongan: పేతురు Pita
 Tswana: Petere, Pitoro
 Turkish: Petro, Petrus
 Ukrainian: Петро (Petro), Пітер (Piter), Петрик (Petryk) (diminutive), Петрусь (Petrus) (diminutive)
 Urdu: (Rock, پتھر) or (lit. Peter, پیٹر)
 Uzbek: Pyotr (as in Russian)
 Venetian: Piero
 Vietnamese: Phi Thơ
 Võro: Piitre
 Welsh: Pedr
 West Frisian: Petrus
 Yoruba: Peteru
 Zulu: Petru

People named Peter (or commonly known as Peter)

See also
 Pete (nickname), a list of people (excluding Peters)
 Pete (given name), a list of people (with the given name)
 Petros (disambiguation)
 Pierce (disambiguation)
 List of people named Piotr
 List of people named Pyotr

References

Masculine given names
Given names of Greek language origin
English masculine given names
German masculine given names
Dutch masculine given names
Swedish masculine given names
Norwegian masculine given names
Slovak masculine given names